Antifragility is a property of systems in which they benefit from shocks.

Antifragile or Anti-fragile may refer to:

 Antifragile (book), a 2012 book by Nassim Nicholas Taleb
 Antifragile (EP), 2022 extended play record by Le Sserafim
 "Antifragile" (song), 2022 song by Le Sserafim